Dom Miguel I (English: Michael I; 26 October 1802 – 14 November 1866), nicknamed "the Absolutist", "the Traditionalist" and "the Usurper", was the King of Portugal between 1828 and 1834, the seventh child and third son of King John VI and his queen, Carlota Joaquina of Spain.

Following his exile as a result of his actions in support of absolutism in the April Revolt (Abrilada), Miguel returned to Portugal as regent and fiancé of his niece Queen Maria II. As regent, he claimed the Portuguese throne in his own right, since according to the so-called Fundamental Laws of the Kingdom his older brother Peter IV and therefore the latter's daughter had lost their rights from the moment that Pedro had made war on Portugal and become the sovereign of a foreign state (Brazilian Empire). This led to a difficult political situation, during which many people were killed, imprisoned, persecuted or sent into exile, and which culminated in the Portuguese Liberal Wars between authoritarian absolutists and progressive constitutionalists. In the end Miguel was forced from the throne and lived the last 32 years of his life in exile.

In order to counter the Republican opposition from the Portuguese Freemasons, the dynastic order known as Order of Saint Michael of the Wing was revived in 1848, with statutes issued by King Miguel I of Portugal.

Early life
Miguel Maria do Patrocinio de Bragança e Bourbon, the third (second surviving) son of King John VI and Carlota Joaquina, was born in the Queluz Royal Palace, Lisbon, and was created by his father Duke of Beja. Some sources have suggested that Miguel I could be the illegitimate son from an adulterous affair between his mother, Queen Carlota, and one of her alleged lovers, possibly D. Pedro José Joaquim Vito de Meneses Coutinho, Marquis of Marialva. Apparently sources close to King John VI confirmed as much by asserting that he had not had sexual relations with his wife for two and a half years prior to Miguel's birth (a period when his parents carried out a conjugal war, during which they were involved in permanent conspiracies, and only encountered each other in rare official circumstances).

But despite the gossip, Miguel was always considered to be a son of the king, by the king, by his mother, by the rest of the family, by the court, and by the church. The "illegitimate child" theories may have had their origins in the writings of pro-liberal propagandists or royalists who wanted to denigrate the queen and undermine the claims of Miguel and of his descendants to the Portuguese throne.

What is clear is that Miguel was the queen's favourite child. After the death of her firstborn, it was Miguel who received most of her attention, rather than Pedro, who was closer to his father.

In 1807, at the age of 5, Miguel accompanied the Portuguese Royal Family on their transfer to Brazil in order to escape from the first Napoleonic invasion of Portugal; he returned in 1821 with John VI and his mother, while his brother Peter remained behind as regent of Brazil.

Miguel was a mischievous child, sometimes seen in the miniature uniform of a general. At sixteen he was seen galloping around Mata-Carvalos, knocking off the hats of passers-by with his riding crop. He spent most of his time with a rowdy band of half-caste or Indian farm-hands. In general, Miguel was spoiled by the queen and her royal household, and clearly influenced by the base tendencies of others. The Duke of Palmela described him as:

"A good man when among good men, and when among the bad, worse than they."

Revolt

Miguel was an avowed conservative and admirer of Prince Metternich, who had referred to the liberal revolutions in the 1820s as unrealistic and without any historical roots:

"A people who can neither read nor write, whose last word is the dagger — fine material for constitutional principles!...The English constitution is the work of centuries....There is no universal recipe for constitutions."

Miguel was 20 years old when he first challenged the liberal institutions established after the 1820 revolution, which may have been part of a wider strategy by the queen. He was at the head of the counter-revolution of 1823, known as the Vilafrancada, which erupted on May 27, 1823, in Vila Franca de Xira. Early in the day, Miguel joined the 23rd Infantry Regiment, commanded by Brigadier Ferreira Sampaio (later Viscount of Santa Mónica) in Vila Franca, where he declared his support for an absolutist monarchy. He immediately called on General Pampluna (later Marquis of Subserra) to join him and his cause. The general, not a fan of the liberal constitution, obeyed his summons and within five days he controlled the insurrectionary forces. The prince, supported by the queen, went so far as to demand the abdication of the king, who, faithful to his earlier oath, wanted to maintain the 1822 Constitution, despite the growing support for absolutist forces in Vila Franca.

Miguel and the queen were interested in overthrowing the parliamentary system and, inspired by the return of the absolutist monarchy in Spain (where the Holy Alliance and French Army had intervened to destroy the liberal forces there) they exploited factionalism and plotted with outside reactionaries to overthrow the liberal Cortes. But General Pampluna was loyal to the king, and made it perfectly clear that he would do nothing to defy the monarch,  and advised the prince to obey his father's summons. The king himself marched on Vila Franca where he received the submission of the troops and his son. But he also took advantage of the situation to abolish the 1822 Constitution and dismiss the Cortes. Many liberals went into exile. Although Miguel returned to Lisbon in triumph, the king was able to maintain complete control of power and did not succumb to the ultra-reactionary forces that supported his abdication.

After the events of the Vilafrancada, Miguel was made Count of Samora Correia and appointed Commander-in-Chief of the Army. But the queen could not tolerate the king's continuing benevolence towards liberals and moderates, nor that he continued to be influenced by and to support ministers such as Palmela and Pamplona, who were more moderate in their outlook.

The mysterious death of the Marquis de Loulé in Salvaterra on February 28, 1824, in which it was suspected that Miguel or his friends were involved, was a symptom of the instability of the period. Prince Miguel was always influenced by his mother; and two months later, on April 30, 1824, as Commander-in-Chief of the Army he gathered his troops and ordered them to arrest ministers and other important people under pretext that a masonic conspiracy to assassinate the king existed, and placed his father in protective custody and incommunicado at Bemposta, where Miguel could "defend and secure his life". The Abrilada, as this was to be known, worried many of the foreign powers. The foreign diplomatic corp (and in particular Marshal Beresford), realizing that the king was a prisoner of his son, traveled to Bemposta and was able to ferry the king away and on board a British warship, the  Windsor Castle. On board, the king summoned his son, whom he dismissed as Commander-in-Chief of the Army, and immediately exiling him to Vienna, where he remained for over three years.

Exile and return

While in Vienna, he was a guest and friend of the Prince Metternich.
Meanwhile, on March 10, 1826, his father, King John VI, died and his brother Peter, the heir-apparent to the throne, became king as Peter IV. Peter, however, was committed to continuing as Emperor of Brazil and therefore abdicated the crown of Portugal after two months (on May 2) in favor of his daughter, Maria II. Since the young sovereign was not yet of age, he instituted a regency, under his sister, Isabel Maria. Peter had already attempted to coerce Miguel to Brazil (1822) away from their mother without any success. Following the death of their father, Peter once again attempted to mend fences within the family and ensure Maria II's right to the throne by offering Miguel the regency of Portugal (when he became 25) under a new liberal Constitutional Charter that would re-establish a constitutional monarchy. Under this arrangement, Queen Maria II and Miguel would be married when she came of age; until then Miguel would be her regent in Portugal. The new Constitutional Charter gave the crown moderating authority between the legislative, executive and judiciary, and introduced a 100-member Chamber of Peers (which included aristocrats and bishops and archbishops), a royal veto and indirect elections. Miguel accepted the proposal from his brother, swore to uphold the Constitutional Charter and, since the young Queen was only nine years old, waited until she would reach the age of marriage.

The regency under Isabel Maria was extremely unstable; discord reigned in the government, there were divisions within the municipal councils, rivalries between ministers and at one point, after the resignation of General Saldanha, a revolt in Lisbon. With Isabel Maria dangerously ill, Peter resolved to entrust his brother Miguel with the kingdom, which Miguel was only too eager to accept. A decree was promulgated on July 3, 1827, that granted Miguel his new role, and he departed from Vienna for Lisbon.

On the trip back to Lisbon he stopped in England, arriving on December 30, 1827. He was met by the Duke of Clarence, heir-presumptive to the British throne, and by other upper members of the English Court who had gathered at the dock to meet him. Arthur Wellesley, 1st Duke of Wellington, then leading an unpopular Tory government, hoped that they could mold Miguel into accepting the constitutional framework that Peter IV had devised, and used this visit to facilitate the transition. After lunching at the Hospital Governor's home, he traveled to London with his entourage in regal carriages and, escorted by cavalry officers, to the Palace of Westminster where he was met by a throng of people. While in London he stayed at the palace of Lord Dudley, on Arlington Street where he entertained his new friends; he was received by the ministers, ambassadors and municipal officials of King George IV, and was generally feted by English nobility, attending concerts and pheasant hunts, and visiting public works (such as the Thames Tunnel which was then under construction and, ironically, collapsed after his visit). On New Year's Eve he visited the King at Windsor Castle and was honored with a magnificent banquet. Later at Rutland House, Miguel received members of the Portuguese diaspora living in England, who presented him with a commemorative medallion. Throughout his visit he was generally well received.

Regent

On January 13, 1828, Miguel departed London; after spending some time at Stratfield Saye, the country home of the Duke of Wellington, he travelled to Plymouth en route to Lisbon. Due to bad weather, he was only able to transfer to the Portuguese frigate Pérola on February 9, which arrived in England accompanied by two British ships. On January 22, the Gazeta de Lisboa (English: Lisbon Gazette) published an open letter from the Ministério da Justiça (English: Ministry of Justice) which permitted any general demonstrations of jubilation (unless otherwise prohibited by law). The prince's ship arrived in Lisbon on February 22 and was met by cannon salvos from ships along the Tagus River and from the hilltops, beginning at two in the afternoon. The river was filled with ships when the Pérola arrived.

Although it was expected that the new regent would disembark at the Praça do Comércio, where a stage had been constructed, Miguel preferred to disembark in Belém. It is believed that Miguel's mother had sent a boatman to pick up the prince and with a message to see her upon arriving in Lisbon, in order to tell her where his loyalties lay. On shore the local population acclaimed their regent with cheers, while bells rang from some church towers and cheerful hymns were sung in the streets. There was a triumphal march to the Ajuda Palace, along streets adorned with silk banners, while the ladies of the city threw flowers. Everywhere there was a multitude of citizenry yelling "Viva o Senhor D. Miguel I nosso rei absoluto", while some interjecting cries of "death to D. Pedro" and "death to the liberal constitution".

But Miguel's role was clearly delineated by his first night in Lisbon: he would govern as regent in the name of the rightful sovereign of Portugal, Queen Maria II. On her reaching marriageable age, Miguel would be her consort. Furthermore, Miguel was obliged to govern in conformity with Peter's Constitutional Charter, something he accepted as a condition of the regency (even if he did not agree with its principles and favoured an absolute monarchy instead).

On February 26, in the main hall of the Ajuda Palace in the presence of both Chambers of the Cortes, the Royal Court and the diplomatic corp, as well as some of the Prince's colleagues from Brazil (carefully orchestrated by the Queen Dowager), the investiture began. At one o'clock Miguel, along with his sister, Isabel Maria, entered the chamber to formally hand over the Regency. After the spectacle of both of them in the same chair, the princess delivered the transitional oath and then left gracefully. Miguel was presented with the written oath to defend the Constitutional Charter along with a Bible, which caused him "...confusion and [he] seemed unable or unwilling to read it." It is also unclear whether he actually swore the oath, since there was no distinct enunciation of the words; nor did any one actually see him kiss the missal (since the Duke of Cadaval obscured the prince during this part of the ceremony). Lord Carnarvon, in Lisbon at the time of the ceremony, wrote of the conclusion of the scene:
"During the whole proceeding...his countenance was overcast, and he had the constrained manner of a most unwilling actor in an embarrassing part. I read the approaching fate of the Constitution in his sullen expression, in the imperfect manner in which the oath was administered, and in the strange and general appearance of hurry and concealment."

On March 1 some citizens of Lisbon gathered at the palace to acclaim Miguel "Absolute King", infuriating many of the liberal politicians and residents. Invested in his new title of regent, he presented his Ministers of State in the evening: Nuno III Álvares Pereira de Melo (Duke of Cadaval), José António de Oliveira Leite de Barros (later Count of Basto), Furtado do Rio de Mendonça (7th Viscount of Barbacena & 2nd Count of Barbacena), José Luis de Sousa Botelho Mourão e Vasconcelos (Count of Vila Real) and the Count of Lousã. Within a week numerous moderate army officers had been dismissed and the military governors of the provinces replaced, as the Prince and Queen Dowager "cleaned house" of their old enemies and liberalist sympathizers.

King of Portugal

On March 13, 1828, Miguel dissolved the Cortes without calling new elections, as stipulated in the Constitutional Charter. Some municipal councils, many nobles and clergy, and several important citizens requested that the regent revoke the Constitutional Charter and reign as king. Blood was first spilled by the liberals, when delegates from the University of Coimbra (who ostensibly traveled to Lisbon to present their compliments to Miguel) were murdered on March 18 by hot-headed Coimbran students. On April 25, the senate (of the university), issued a proclamation in which they requested that Miguel assume the throne. This only fueled the divisions between liberals and absolutists. Because of the independence of Brazil, Miguel's supporters considered Miguel to be the legitimate heir to the crown of Portugal. If, to liberals, the name of Miguel was despised, to the legitimists (the absolutists) it was venerated. But Miguel's reign was immediately marked by cruel, almost tyrannical, governance which some attribute to him personally; however some blame the injustices on his subordinates, while others attribute them to the malevolence of Queen Charlotte.

On May 3, 1828, the very nobles who had been nominated by Peter to the new Chamber of Peers met in the Palace of the Duke of Lafões, and invited Miguel to convoke a new cortes consisting of the Three Estates with a view to deciding the legitimate succession to the throne. Such a cortes met in June at Ajuda, where the Bishop of Viseu proposed that Miguel should assume the crown since "...the hand of the Almighty led Your Majesty from the banks of the Danube to the shore of the Tagus to save his people...". On July 7 Miguel was acclaimed as absolute ruler, and on July 15 the Three Estate Cortes closed.

Shortly afterwards the military garrison in Oporto revolted, formed a provisional governmental junta, and marched on Coimbra to defend the liberal cause. But the general in command of these troops was indecisive, and Miguel was able to raise his own troops, create a battalion of volunteers and blockade Oporto. In Lagos a similar revolt was attempted, but immediately quashed when the liberal General Saraiva was shot by the Miguelist General Póvoas. On this occasion, João Carlos Saldanha (later Duke of Saldanha) and Pedro de Sousa Holstein (later 1st Duke of Palmela), who had arrived from England on board the British ship Belfast in order to lead constitutional forces, quickly re-embarked, judging the liberal cause lost. The liberal army escaped to deplorable conditions in Galicia where they awaited the next move. In the former regency's court there were few strong supporters of a constitutional monarchy; Princess Isabella Maria was supported by weak-willed ministers or incompetents and was personally too timid to stand up to Miguel. The liberals and their supporters escaped into exile. All of Portugal recognized the sovereignty of the monarch, except the islands of Madeira and Terceira; Madeira was easily subjugated, but Terceira remained faithful to the liberal cause.

The excess zeal of his supporters to prosecute the liberals would blacken the reputation of Miguel's regime. During the liberal insurrection on March 6, 1829, in Cais do Sodré, Brigadier Moreira, his officers and their supporters were all bayoneted. On May 7, the members of the rebel garrison of Oporto who had revolted were also executed. In some cases, the local population contributed to these horrors and reprisals, as in Vila Franca da Xira where they assassinated 70 people believed to have liberal sympathies. Although these actions were disapproved of by many of Miguel's ministers, the Count of Basto was not one of them.  Even the Viscount of Queluz, a medic and intimate friend of the Miguel, was exiled to Alfeite for joining the chorus of those who challenged the reprisal killings. But the Queen Mother continued to support the attacks on liberals, and motivated these actions in order to strengthen the monarchy. Even after she died on 7 January 1830, many atrocities continued to be committed in the name of Miguel, some against foreign nationals who intervened in the politics of Portugal.

While Spain, The Holy See, and the United States recognized Miguel as king, in England and France there was little public support for the regime. The imprudence that the Miguelist government showed in harassing English and French foreign nationals provoked them to protest. Eventually Admiral Albin Roussin, was ordered by Louis Philippe I (who, like England, could not obtain any diplomatic satisfaction), to take action; he sailed up the Tagus, captured eight Portuguese ships and forcibly imposed a treaty (July 14, 1831). But, Miguelist reprisals on liberals continued; most sentences were carried out within 24 hours. The 4th Infantry, in Lisbon, registered 29 executions on August 22 and 23, 1831, alone.

Liberal Wars

Only the island of Terceira in the Azores remained loyal to Queen Maria II; the constitutional government continued to function there in exile. At first João Carlos Saldanha was unable to reach the island, owing to the hostility of an English cruiser, but the Count of Vila Flor (later Duke of Terceira) was more successful; he arrived on the island, rebuilt the defences and quickly beat back Miguel's forces (on August 11, 1829) as they were attempting to invade the island. By 1831 the liberals had taken over all the islands of the Azores.

Peter, after abdicating the imperial crown of Brazil, placed himself at the head of the Liberal Army (1831) and from the Azores launched an invasion of northern Portugal, Landing at Mindelo, near Oporto which he quickly occupied. But Miguel's army was formidable, composed of the best troops, with dedicated volunteers and enthusiastic militiamen (although not, perhaps, the best senior officers). They easily encircled the city and lay siege to it. As the defense of Oporto persisted, Miguel resolved to visit his troops in April 1833. But in the meantime Lisbon fell into the hands of the Duke of Terceira, who had left Oporto earlier in the Liberal fleet commanded by Charles John Napier, disembarked in the Algarve and marched across the Alentejo to defeat the Miguelist General Teles Jordão (seizing the city on July 24). Napier, after defeating a Miguelist fleet off Cape St. Vincent, joined the Duke of Terceira in the north, taking control of the Tagus.

Miguel was assisted by the French General Bourmont, who, after the fall of Charles X of France came with many of his legitimist officers to the aid of the king of Portugal (that is, Miguel). He was later replaced by the Scottish General Ranald MacDonnell who withdrew the Miguelist army besieging Lisbond to the almost impregnable heights of Santarém, where Miguel established his base of operations. The battles continued in earnest. In Alcácer the Miguelist forces captured some ground but this was quickly lost to General Saldanha in Pernes and Almoster. The latter action (February 18, 1834) was the most violent and bloody of the civil war. In the end, politics sealed Miguel's fate: his alliance with Carlos of Spain alienated the sympathies of Ferdinand VII of Spain, who recognized Maria's claim to the Portuguese throne, and concluded a quadruple alliance with the queen and Peter as well as with the governments of France and England.

The Spanish General Rodil entered into Portugal while pursuing D. Carlos and his small force and at the same time the Duke of Terceira won the Battle of Asseiceira (16 May 1834) making D. Miguel's position critical. Miguel escaped Santarém and moved south-east in the direction of Elvas. While Miguel made for Évora, his generals voted in a council of war to suspend hostilities and sue for peace. Miguel accepted the decision.

After a three-year civil war, Miguel I was forced to abdicate at the Concession of Evoramonte (26 May 1834). While Carlos was transported to England (he later secretly returned to Spain), Miguel embarked on 1 June 1834 on a British warship from Sines bound for Genoa; he lived in exile first in Italy, then in England, and finally in Germany. He never returned to Portugal.

Second exile and death

In December 1834 the Portuguese Cortes banished Miguel and all his descendants from Portugal upon pain of immediate death. The Constitution of 1838 (article 98) categorically excluded the collateral Miguelist line from the throne (although with the return to the Constitutional Charter in 1842, this ceased to have force). The 1834 law remained in effect until repealed in May 1950. During his exile, he was known as Duke of Braganza, as well as Marquis of Vila Viçosa, Count of Arraiolos, Count of Barcelos, Count of Neiva and Count of Ourém.

On 15 January 1837 the Spanish Cortes, then in midst of the First Carlist War (1833–39), excluded Miguel from the Spanish succession, on the grounds that he was in rebellion along with his maternal uncle Carlos, the first Carlist pretender of Spain. Miguel's eldest sister Teresa, Princess of Beira, and his nephews (three sons of late Infanta Maria Francisca of Portugal, and Sebastian, son of Teresa, Princess of Beira) were also excluded.

Miguel lived the rest of his life in exile and, removed from Portuguese politics, his character altered radically; in his later years he was a portly heavily bearded patriarch and lacked the cowboy persona of his early life. He refused to accede to the terms of the Concession of Evoramonte and thereby forfeited his generous pension from the Portuguese government. He lived for a time as a destitute refugee in Rome, in apartments provided by Pope Gregory XVI, who also gave him a small monthly allowance. Following the death of Pope Gregory and the election of Pius IX as Pope, D. Miguel moved to London, arriving on 2 February 1847. In 1851, he moved to the Grand Duchy of Baden in southern Germany and married Princess Adelaide of Löwenstein-Wertheim-Rosenberg. They settled in the former Cistercian monastery of Bronnbach, and raised seven children. His widow succeeded in securing advantageous marriages for all their daughters.

Miguel died while hunting at Bronnbach, Grand Duchy of Baden on 14 November 1866. He was buried in his wife's family's vault in the Franciscan monastery of Engelberg at Grossheubach, Bavaria. In 1967 his body and that of his wife (then resting in Ryde on the Isle of Wight in England) were transferred to the Braganza pantheon in the old Monastery of São Vicente de Fora in Lisbon.

Titles and honours

In addition to his hereditary titles, over the course of his career Miguel received many awards and honors, including the following.

Portuguese honours
 Grand Commander of the Three Military Orders of Christ, Aviz and St. James
 Grand Cross of the Tower and Sword
 Grand Cross of the Immaculate Conception of Vila Viçosa
 Grand Master of the Order of St. Michael of the Wing (revoked)
 Grand Prior of the Order of St. John of Jerusalem in Portugal

Foreign dynastic orders

Posthumously, or during his reign, Miguel was known by various epithets:
 O Tradicionalista ("The Traditionalist")
 O Usurpador ("The Usurper")
 O Absolutista ("The Absolutist")
 O Sacrificado ("The Sacrificed")
 O Rei Absoluto ("The Absolute King")

Marriage and descendants

In 1851, at the age of 48, he married Princess Adelaide of Löwenstein-Wertheim-Rosenberg, by whom he had a son and six daughters.

Ancestry

Patrilineal descent

Patrilineal descent is the principle behind membership in royal houses, as it can be traced back through the generations.

Miguel's patriline is the line from which he is descended father to son.

Robert II, Count of Worms, Rheingau and Hesbaye, 770–807
Robert III, Count of Worms and Rheingau, 808–834
Robert IV the Strong, Duke of Maine, 820–866
Robert I, King of the Franks, 866–923
Hugh the Great, Count of Paris, 898–956
Hugh Capet, King of the Franks, 941–996
Robert II, King of the Franks, 972–1031 
Robert I, Duke of Burgundy, 1011–1076
Henri of Burgundy, 1035–
Henrique, Count of Portugal, 1066–1112
Afonso Henriques, King of Portugal, 1109–1185
Sancho I, King of Portugal, 1154–1211
Afonso II, King of Portugal, 1185–1223
Afonso III, King of Portugal and the Algarve, 1210–1279
Dinis, King of Portugal and the Algarve, 1261–1325
Afonso IV, King of Portugal and the Algarve, 1291–1357
Pedro I, King of Portugal and the Algarve, 1320–1367
João I, King of Portugal and the Algarve, 1357–1433
Afonso, Duke of Braganza, 1377–1461
Fernando I, Duke of Braganza, 1403–1478
Fernando II, Duke of Braganza, 1430–1483
Jaime, Duke of Braganza, 1479–1532
Teodósio I, Duke of Braganza, 1510–1563
João I, Duke of Braganza, 1543–1583
Teodósio II, Duke of Braganza, 1558–1630
João IV, King of Portugal and the Algarves, 1604–1656
Pedro II, King of Portugal and the Algarves, 1648–1706
João V, King of Portugal and the Algarves, 1689–1750
Pedro III, King of Portugal and the Algarves, 1717–1786
João VI, King of Portugal, Brazil and the Algarves, 1767–1826
Miguel, King of Portugal and the Algarves, 1802–1866

References
Notes

Sources

External links

 Law of his banishment (19 December 1834)
 Diccionario Histórico – (Portuguese) website on the life of Miguel
 

1802 births
1866 deaths
House of Braganza
Dukes of Braganza
Portuguese infantes
19th-century Portuguese monarchs
People of the Liberal Wars
People from Lisbon
Constables of Portugal
Burials at the Monastery of São Vicente de Fora
Knights Grand Cross of the Order of the Immaculate Conception of Vila Viçosa
3
3
3
Knights of the Golden Fleece of Spain
Grand Crosses of the Order of Saint Louis
Recipients of the Order of St. Anna, 1st class
Grand Crosses of the Order of Saint Stephen of Hungary
Royal reburials
Sons of emperors